Twilight Ophera is a symphonic black metal band from Finland. The band formed in 1996, and signed with British label Cacophonous the following year. This label folded in 2000, and the group went through lineup changes before signing with Crash Music in the United States in 2003.

Band members
 Mikko Häkkinen - vocals
 Mikko Kaipainen - guitar
 Toni Näykki - guitar
 Lord Heikkinen - bass
 Timo Puranen - keyboards
 Janne Ojala - drums

Former members
 Timo Kollin - drums 
 Sauli "Karkkunen" Lehtisaari (died 2004) - vocals
 Anu Kohonen - vocals 
 Jani Viljakainen - bass 
 T. Kristian - drums

Discography
 Shadows Embrace the Dark (1997)
 Midnight Horror (1999)
 The End of Halcyon Age (2003)
 Twilight Ophera and the Order of the Sanguine Diadem presents: Descension (2006)

References

External links
 Twilight Ophera on Myspace

Finnish black metal musical groups
Symphonic black metal musical groups
Finnish symphonic metal musical groups
Musical groups established in 1996